Conopomorphina is a genus of moths in the family Gracillariidae.

Species
Conopomorphina aptata (Meyrick, 1914)
Conopomorphina gypsochroma Vári, 1961
Conopomorphina ochnivora Vári, 1961

External links
Global Taxonomic Database of Gracillariidae (Lepidoptera)

Gracillariinae
Gracillarioidea genera